The Mainichi Film Award for Best Supporting Actor is a film award given at the Mainichi Film Awards.

Award Winners

References

Film awards for supporting actor
Supporting Actor
Awards established in 1952
1952 establishments in Japan
Lists of films by award